The Union Village Covered Bridge is a historic covered bridge, carrying Academy Road across the Ompompanoosuc River in Union Village, Thetford, Vermont.  Built in 1867, it is the state's longest 19th-century multiple kingpost truss bridge.  It was listed on the National Register of Historic Places in 1974.

Description and history
The Union Village Covered Bridge stands in southern Thetford, in rural Union Village, spanning the south-flowing Ompompanoosuc River on Academy Road. It rests on original abutments of dry-laid stone that have been faced or capped in concrete. The floor supports consist of stringers that have been tie-bolted together, reinforced in the 20th century by the addition of laminated beams to the underside. The exterior is finished in vertical board siding, with square window openings cut into the sides. The roof is made of standing seam metal.

The bridge was built in 1867, and is one of two surviving 19th-century covered bridges in Thetford; the other is the Thetford Center Covered Bridge.  The bridge underwent a major rehabilitation in 2002-2003.  It is the state's longest multiple kingpost truss bridge.

See also
 
 
 
 National Register of Historic Places listings in Orange County, Vermont
 List of Vermont covered bridges
 List of bridges on the National Register of Historic Places in Vermont

References

Road bridges on the National Register of Historic Places in Vermont
National Register of Historic Places in Orange County, Vermont
Covered bridges in Orange County, Vermont
Covered bridges in Vermont
Buildings and structures in Thetford, Vermont
Wooden bridges in Vermont
King post truss bridges in the United States
1867 establishments in Vermont
Bridges completed in 1867